The 1927 Detroit Titans football team represented the University of Detroit as an independent during the 1927 college football season. Detroit outscored opponents by a combined total of 235 to 47 and finished with a 7–2 record in their third year under head coach Gus Dorais. The team's losses came in games against Knute Rockne's 1927 Notre Dame team that has been rated as a national champion and against Army which was the only team to beat Notre Dame in 1927.

The team was led by halfback Lloyd Brazil of whom coach Dorais later said: "As far as I'm concerned, there were only three great collegiate backs in my lifetime -- Jim Thorpe, George Gipp and Lloyd Brazil."

Schedule

References

Detroit
Detroit Titans football seasons
Detroit Titans football
Detroit Titans football